Brackenber is a hamlet in the civil parish of Murton in Cumbria, England. It is near the town of Appleby-in-Westmorland and the village of Hilton, Cumbria.

See also

Listed buildings in Murton, Cumbria

External links
 Brackenber Lodge Holiday Cottage - Lake District - A 3 bedroom cottage converted from part of the Victorian Workhouse at Brackenber Lodge

Hamlets in Cumbria
Murton, Cumbria